Robert Fisher was an English professional football manager who coached French team Olympique Lillois between 1934 and 1935.

References

Year of birth missing
Year of death missing
English football managers
English expatriate football managers
Olympique Lillois managers
English expatriate sportspeople in France
Expatriate football managers in France